Semyon Aronovich Gershgorin (August 24, 1901 – May 30, 1933) was a Soviet (born in Pruzhany, Belarus, Russian Empire) mathematician.  He began as a student at the Petrograd Technological Institute in 1923, became a Professor in 1930, and was given an appointment at the Leningrad Mechanical Engineering Institute in the same year. His contributions include the Gershgorin circle theorem.

The spelling of S. A. Gershgorin's name (Семён Аронович Гершгорин) has been transliterated in several different ways, including Geršgorin, Gerschgorin, Gerszgorin, Gershgorin, Gershgeroff, Qureshin and from the Yiddish spelling  to Hirshhorn and Hirschhorn.

The authors of his obituary  write about Gershgorin's death at the very young age of 31: "A vigorous, stressful job weakened Semyon Aranovich's health; he succumbed to an accidental illness."

References

External links
.

1901 births
1933 deaths
Soviet mathematicians
20th-century Belarusian mathematicians
Belarusian Jews
People from Pruzhany